The  is a Japanese encyclopaedic work initiated by the Meiji government, and compiled from historical source documents. Over the period from 1896 to 1914, a total of 1,000 volumes were compiled, under various subject categories.

External links
 国文学研究資料館「古事類苑データベース」（HTML版）  (全文検索版）
 国際日本文化研究センター「電子化古事類苑プロジェクト」 、「故事類苑全文データベース」
 国立国会図書館「近代デジタルライブラリー」『古事類苑』（和装本・書影） 

Japanese encyclopedias
History articles needing translation from Japanese Wikipedia
19th-century encyclopedias
20th-century encyclopedias